The bluish flowerpiercer (Diglossa caerulescens) is a species of bird in the family Thraupidae. It is found in humid montane forest in Bolivia, Colombia, Ecuador, Peru and Venezuela.

References

bluish flowerpiercer
Birds of the Northern Andes
bluish flowerpiercer
bluish flowerpiercer
Taxonomy articles created by Polbot